Transport Canada is the department within the Government of Canada responsible for developing regulations, policies and services of road, rail, marine and air transportation in Canada. It is part of the Transportation, Infrastructure and Communities (TIC) portfolio. The current Minister of Transport is Omar Alghabra. Transport Canada is headquartered in Ottawa, Ontario.

History
The Department of Transport was created in 1935 by the government of William Lyon Mackenzie King in recognition of the changing transportation environment in Canada at the time. It merged three departments: the former Department of Railways and Canals, the Department of Marine, and the Civil Aviation Branch of the Department of National Defence (c. 1927 when it replaced the Air Board) under C. D. Howe, who would use the portfolio to rationalize the governance and provision of all forms of transportation (air, water and land).  He created a National Harbours Board and Trans-Canada Air Lines.  The Department of Transport Act came into force November 2, 1936.

Prior to a 1994 federal government reorganization, Transport Canada had a wide range of operational responsibilities including the Canadian Coast Guard, the Saint Lawrence Seaway, airports and seaports, as well as Via Rail and CN Rail. Significant cuts to Transport Canada at that time resulted in CN Rail being privatized, the coast guard being transferred to Fisheries and Oceans, and the seaway and various ports and airports being transferred to local operating authorities. Transport Canada emerged from this process as a department focused on policy and regulation rather than transportation operations.

In 2004, Transport Canada introduced non-passenger screening to enhance both airport and civil aviation security.

Headquarters
Transport Canada's headquarters are located in Ottawa at Place de Ville, Tower C. Transport Canada also has regional headquarters in:

 Vancouver – Government of Canada Building, 820-800 Burrard Street
 Edmonton – Canada Place, 9700 Jasper Avenue NW
 Winnipeg – Macdonald Building, 344 Edmonton Street
 Toronto – Government of Canada Building, 4900 Yonge Street
 Montreal – Pierre Elliott Trudeau Airport, 700 Place Leigh-Capreol
 Moncton – Heritage Building, 95 Foundry Street

Structure
Minister of Transport Omar Alghabra
Deputy Minister, Transport Canada, Arun Thangaraj
Associate Deputy Minister, Dominic Rochon 
Assistant Deputy Minister, Safety and Security, Lisa Setlawke
Associate Assistant Deputy Minister, Safety and Security, Nicholas Robinson
Assistant Deputy Minister, Programs, Stephanie Hébert
Assistant Deputy Minister, Policy, Serge Bijimine
Assistant Deputy Minister, Corporate Services, Ryan Pilgrim
Chief Digital Officer, Raj Thuppal
Director General, Communications, Jacqueline Roy
Chief Audit and Evaluation Executive, Chantal Roy
Departmental General Counsel, Alain Langlois
Regional Director General, Atlantic Region, Daniel Kumpf
Regional Director General, Quebec Region, Mélanie Morier
Regional Director General, Ontario Region, Duwayne Williams
Regional Director General, Prairie and Northern Region, Shari Currie
Assistant Deputy Minister, Pacific Region, Robert Dick

Enforcement

Transport Canada is responsible for enforcing several Canadian legislation, including the Aeronautics Act, Transportation of Dangerous Goods Act, Motor Vehicle Safety Act, Canada Transportation Act, Railway Safety Act, Canada Shipping Act, 2001, Marine Transportation Security Act amongst others. Each inspector with delegated power from the Minister of Transport receives official credentials to exercise their power, as shown on the right. These inspectors are public officers identified within the Criminal Code of Canada.

Road

The Motor Vehicle Safety Act was established in 1971 in order to create safety standards for cars in Canada. The department also acts as the federal government's funding partner with provincial (and territorial) transport ministries on jointly-funded provincial transportation infrastructure projects for new highways.

TC also manage a database of traffic collisions in Canada.

Rail

Transport Canada's role in railways include:

 railway safety
 surface and intermodal security
 strategies for rail travel accessibility
 safety of federally regulated railway bridges
 safety and security of international bridges and tunnels (US/CAN border)
 Inspecting and testing traffic control signals, grade crossing warning systems
 rail operating rules
 regulations, standards and services for safe transport of dangerous goods
 Canadian Transport Emergency Centre to assist emergency response and handling dangerous goods emergencies

Following allegations by shippers of service level deterioration, on April 7, 2008, the federal government of Canada launched a review of railway freight service within the country. Transport Canada, which is managing the review, plans to investigate the relationships between Canadian shippers and the rail industry, especially with regards to the two largest railroad companies in the country, Canadian Pacific Railway and Canadian National Railway.
On June 26, 2013, the Fair Rail Freight Service Act became law which was a response to the Rail Freight Service Review's Final Report.

Marine

Transport Canada is responsible for the waterways inside and surrounding Canada. These responsibilities include:

 responding and investigating marine accidents within Canadian waters
 enforcing marine acts and regulations such as the Canada Marine Act
 establishing and enforcing marine personnel standards and pilotage
 Marine Safety
 Marine Security
 regulating the operation of marine vessels in Canadian waters

As of 2003 the Office of Boating Safety and the Navigable Waters Protection Program were transferred back to Transport Canada. As was certain regulatory aspects of Emergency Response (Oil pollution)

Transport Canada Marine Safety (TCMS) is the division under Transport Canada that maintains and enhances marine safety and work to protect life, health, property and the marine environment. This includes providing services that are mandated by acts and regulations such as certification for Canadian seafarers and related professionals.

Aviation

Transport Canada's role in aviation is the most detailed. Until 1996, Transport Canada was responsible for both regulation of aviation and the operation of air traffic services, as well as the operation of most major airports. On November 1, 1996, these responsibilities were split: Transport Canada remains responsible for regulation (through the Canadian Aviation Regulations (CARs) and Standards), and a new regulated non-profit company, NAV CANADA, took over responsibility for all civilian air traffic services. This change was (and remains) controversial within the private aviation sector because NAV CANADA began charging for services that were previously funded through a specific tax on aviation gasoline.  The specific tax remains but separate charges are levied by NAV CANADA.
In 2005, the United States was discussing a similar delegation of the FAA's air traffic services to an "arm's-length" government corporation.

During the 1990s, Transport Canada also began privatizing the operation of large airports, and divesting itself of small airports altogether (typically handing them over to municipalities). Following the 1994 National Airports Policy, Transport Canada retains ownership of most airports with 200,000 or more annual passenger movements, as well as the primary airports serving the federal, provincial, and territorial capitals, but leases most of these airports (which make up the National Airports System) to outside operators; currently, there are 26 airports in the system, of which 22 are operated by 21 Airport Authorities, an example of which is the Greater Toronto Airports Authority.

In 2003, Transport Canada launched its Electronic Collection of Air Transportation Statistics program to collect passenger and cargo data in real-time from air carriers flying in Canada. ECATS will expand into the field of general aviation during 2008.   collects data on all accidents and incidents, no matter how minor, using the Civil Aviation Daily Occurrence Reporting System (CADORS).

Transport Canada continues to be responsible for licensing pilots and other aviation specialists (such as dispatchers and mechanics) as well as registering and inspecting aircraft. It is also responsible for the safety certification and continuous safety oversight of most forms of commercial operations. These responsibilities are carried out by 6 regions, Atlantic, Quebec, Ontario, Prairie & Northern, Pacific and the sixth region based in Ottawa (National Capital Region) is responsible for air operators operating international flights and certain types of large aeroplanes.  The Canadian Aviation Regulations (CARs) are also under Transport Canada control.

The Canadian Air Transport Security Authority is a Crown corporation that reports to parliament through the Minister of Transport.  It is responsible for the protection of specific elements of the air transportation system – from passenger and baggage screening to screening airport workers. In spring 2017 CATSA and the Canada Border Services Agency began their roll-out "as part of a broader effort to modernize and streamline clearance procedures at Canadian airports" of the self-service border clearance kiosks programme, under which Canadian travellers are subject to facial recognition technology upon re-entry to the country. It was expected that as a cost-cutting measure the programme was to reduce the number of civilian interactions with civil servants.

Civil Aviation Authority

Transport Canada's Civil Aviation (TCCA) Directorate is Canada's civil aviation authority. It has existed since 1936, when civil aviation was transferred from the Civil Aviation Branch of the Department of National Defence.

Based in Ottawa, the Directorate has regional offices across Canada in geographical regions:

 Pacific – British Columbia
 Prairie and Northern – Alberta, Saskatchewan, Manitoba, Northwest Territories, Yukon
 Ontario
 Quebec
 Atlantic Region – Nova Scotia, PEI, Newfoundland and Labrador, New Brunswick

Air accident investigation
Prior to 1990, Transport Canada was responsible for aircraft incident investigation through:

 Aircraft Accident Investigation Branch (1960–1984)
 Canadian Aviation Safety Board (1984–1990)

After 1990, the role was transferred over to Transportation Safety Board of Canada.

Aircraft fleet

As of February 2023, Transport Canada lists the following aircraft in its database  and operate as ICAO airline designator TGO, and telephony TRANSPORT.

 10 - Beechcraft C90A
  1 - Bell206B (helicopter)
  3 - Bell 407 (helicopter)
  7 - Bell 412EP (helicopter)
 16 - Bell 429 (helicopter)
  6 - Cessna 550 Citation II
  1 -  de Havilland Canada Dash 7-150IR (in 1990  a single aircraft (C-GCFR) replaced two specially modified ice patrol Lockheed L-188 Electra's registered as CF-NAY and C-GNDZ (both ex-Northwest Orient Airlines) that were operated under contract (for Ice Reconnaissance) for the Canadian government by Nordair in the late 1970s and later by Canadian Airlines. A second Electra CF-NAZ was written off in 1977 after an accident). and CF-NAX was sold in 1977 by Nordair and now owned by Buffalo Airways as C-FIJX
  3- Bombardier Dash 8-100 - for Fisheries and Oceans Canada and Canadian Coast Guard

Recent controversies

Transport Canada has been the centre of a number of controversies in recent years. In September 2009, the CBC's Fifth Estate produced a report "Riding on Risk", which detailed alleged mismanagement and cover-ups in Transport Canada. The story was sparked by a lost memory stick which was found by a journalism student. The memory stick contained many documents showing efforts by security inspectors to enforce aviation security regulations, and the perceived failure of management to do so. The CBC report also detailed the alleged reprisals — and fear of reprisals — against whistleblowers and other employees.

Transport Canada's move to Safety Management Systems (SMS) in its regulation of civil aviation has been criticised. Whistleblower Hugh Danford, a former inspector at Transport Canada, went on record criticizing this approach, indicating that it would increase risk to the flying public. Critics have warned that introducing SMS to the aviation sector is "a recipe for disaster". However, the aviation accident rate in Canada declined over a number of years to 2008.

The rail industry in Canada, which has had SMS since 2001 and is also regulated by Transport Canada, had shown a marked increase in accidents under this regulatory scheme to 2006.

Several Transport Canada senior executives, including Assistant Deputy Minister, Safety and Security, Marc Grégoire, were sued in 2008 for reprisals against another whistleblower, Ian Bron. who reported that the Marine Security framework was riddled with gaps.

On 23 December 2013, it was revealed that a Transport Canada inspector had been dismissed for falsifying departmental reports. The identity of the guilty party was not revealed, because of a concern for his or her privacy.

The Canadian Association of Journalists nominated Transport Canada for its Secrecy Award for a second time in 2008, indicating that a bill to amend the Aeronautics Act will cause "a veil of secrecy [to] fall over all information reported by airlines about performance, safety violations, aviation safety problems and their resolution."

In September 2009, Transport Canada was alleged to have fraudulently charged expenses to the non-existent Mackenzie Valley Pipeline project. This story came to light after repeated efforts by access to information expert Ken Rubin, and repeated denials by the department that the incriminating documents existed or that any impropriety had occurred.

Transport Canada was criticized in 2008 for its refusal to approve electric cars manufactured in Canada.

In 2017, Transport Canada proposed regulations for drones that were widely criticized.

As a result of the Ethiopian Airlines Flight 302 crash and the Lion Air Flight 610 crash, which occurred five months prior to the Ethiopian crash, most airlines and countries began grounding the Boeing 737 MAX 8 (and in many cases all MAX variants) due to safety concerns, but Transport Canada declined to temporarily ground Boeing 737 Max 8 operating in Canada. However, on 13 March, Transport Canada reversed the decision and grounded all 737 MAX 8 and MAX 9 aircraft.

See also
 ecoAuto – Canadian government incentive program to purchase fuel-efficient vehicles.
 Pleasure Craft Operator Card – Mandatory Boater Education in Canada
 Canadian Air Carrier Protection Program
 Transportation Safety Board of Canada
 Canadian Transportation Agency
 Air Board (Canada)

The provinces and territories also have their own transportation departments, namely to deal with roads and vehicle licensing and regulations:

 British Columbia Ministry of Transportation
Ministry of Highways and Infrastructure (Saskatchewan)
 Minister of Infrastructure and Transportation (Manitoba)
 Ministry of Transportation of Ontario
 Transports Québec
 Department of Transportation (New Brunswick)
 Nova Scotia Department of Transportation and Infrastructure Renewal

References

 
Federal departments and agencies of Canada
Canadian transport law
Canada
Investment promotion agencies
Funding bodies of Canada
Ministries established in 1935
1935 establishments in Canada